Hinemoa was a silent film made in New Zealand by Gaston Méliès in 1913.

Hinemoa is possibly the first film to have been made in New Zealand, although it is doubtful whether the film was ever screened in the country.

Plot
No copy of Hinemoa survives, but the film would have told the story of the legend of Hinemoa and Tutanekai.

Background
In 1912, the Méliès brothers' company Star Film was in some financial strife, as a result of which Gaston Méliès travelled to the South Pacific in search of fashionably exotic locales, people and stories.

Hinemoa was one of five two-reel films screened in New York City in 1913; probably including three other 1913 films he shot in New Zealand, Loved by a Maori Chieftess, How Chief Te Ponga Won His Bride and The River Wanganui. Méliès sent his film to the United States for post-production treatment, so it is doubtful if any were shown in New Zealand. Several other films shot by Méliès on the expedition failed to survive the tropical humidity.

See also
 Hinemoa – New Zealand produced and released film by George Tarr a year later.

References

External links 
 
 Hinemoa (1913) at SilentEra

1910s New Zealand films
1913 in New Zealand
French silent short films
1913 films
Lost French films
French black-and-white films
Films directed by Gaston Méliès
Films produced by Gaston Méliès
1913 drama films
Films set in New Zealand
New Zealand drama films
New Zealand silent short films
French drama films
1913 lost films
Lost drama films
Lost New Zealand films
Films about Māori people
Silent drama films
1910s French films